The chapters of the manga series D.N.Angel are written and illustrated by Yukiru Sugisaki. The first chapter premiered in Japan in the November 1997 issue of Monthly Asuka. New chapters were serialized in the magazine monthly until August 2005, when Sugisaki put the series on an extended hiatus. It eventually returned to serialization, starting in the April 2008 issue of Monthly Asuka. The series focuses on Daisuke Niwa, a middle school student who transforms into the phantom thief Dark Mousy whenever he thinks about his crush, Risa Harada.

The individual chapters are collected and published in tankōbon volumes by Kadokawa Shoten. The first volume was released on November 13, 1997; a total of 20 volumes have been released, the last five in e-book format only. A limited tankōbon edition is offered as a bonus in Gekkan Asuka'''s May 2019 release, published on March 23rd.Gekkan Asuka has announced on February 23, 2019, that a kanzenban edition would compile in 2020 all DNAngel volumes into 10 books.

The series is licensed for an English-language release in North America by Tokyopop, which released the first volume of the series in April 2004. On November 8, 2005, Tokyopop released a box set containing the first two volumes of the series.

In August 2003, while the primary series was on hiatus, a second manga series, D.N.Angel TV Animation Series began serialization in Monthly Asuka. Also written by Sugisaki, the short series was based on the anime adaptation, which had diverged from the storyline of the manga series. D.N.Angel TV Animation Series finished its serialization in the October 2003 issue. It was published in 5 tankōbon'' volumes by Kadokawa Shoten.

Volume list

See also
 List of D.N.Angel characters
 List of D.N.Angel episodes

Notes

References

External links
Official Kadokawa D.N.Angel website 

D.N.Angel